Omar (also Romanized as ‘Omār) is a village in Ahram Rural District, in the Central District of Tangestan County, Bushehr Province, Iran. At the 2006 census, its population was 101, in 24 families.

References 

Populated places in Tangestan County